The 1946 Taça de Portugal Final was the final match of the 1945–46 Taça de Portugal, the 8th season of the Taça de Portugal, the premier Portuguese football cup competition organized by the Portuguese Football Federation (FPF). The match was played on 30 June 1946 at the Estádio do Lumiar in Lisbon, and opposed two Primeira Liga sides: Atlético CP and Sporting CP. Sporting CP defeated Atlético CP 4–2 to claim their third Taça de Portugal.

Match

Details

References

1946
Taca
Sporting CP matches
Atlético Clube de Portugal matches